Events in the year 1802 in India.

Events
National income - ₹11,115 million
 Treaty of Bassein.
 Maratha Wars, 1802-05.

Law
Criminal Jurisdiction Act (British statute)

References

 
Years of the 19th century in India